My Roommate Is a Gumiho is a 2021 South Korean television drama series starring Jang Ki-yong  and Lee Hye-ri. The series tells story of romance between a 999-year-old nine-tailed fox named Shin Woo-Yeo and a female college student named Lee Dam who accidentally swallows Shin Woo-Yeo's bead. It premiered on streaming platform iQIYI worldwide and cable channel TVN on May 26, 2021, and aired on Wednesdays and Thursdays at 22.40 (KST) for 16 episodes till July 15.

The series ended on July 15, 2021, with its last episode recording an average nationwide viewership ratings of 4%. It attained an average viewership of 948 thousand per episode during its run.

Synopsis
Gumiho, literally "nine-tailed fox", is a creature that appears in the folktales and legends of Korea.

It is based on an original webtoon. It tells the story of a male Gumiho who has lived for hundreds of years to become a human being; having his fox beads taken away by a female college student in an accident, they live together in his house to solve this problem.

Cast

Main
Jang Ki-yong as Shin Woo-yeo
A 999-year-old Gumiho who wants to become a human.
Lee Hye-ri as Lee Dam
A college student born in 1999 who accidentally swallows a fox bead. She has never been in a relationship before.
Kang Han-na as Yang Hye-sun
Shin Woo-yeo's friend who used to be Gumiho for 700 years but has now turned into a human. She's slow-witted but an expert in romance.
Kim Do-wan as Do Jae-jin
Has a history of being dumped and eventually develops a relationship with Yang Hye-sun. He is Dam and Choi Soo-kyung's best friend.

Supporting
Bae In-hyuk as Gye Sun-woo
Lee Dam's senior in college who is a ladies' favorite. He initially develops interest on Lee Dam because she keeps on avoiding him.
Park Kyung-hye as Choi Soo-kyung
Lee Dam's and Do Jae-jin's best friend.
Choi Woo-sung as Lee Dan
Lee Dam's younger brother
Kim Do-yeon as Gye Seo-woo
Gye Sun-woo's younger sister.
Kim Kang-min as Jung Seok
Lee Dam, Choi Soo-kyung and Do Jae-jin's senior.
Bang Eun-jung as Jeon Da-young

Special appearances
 Jung So-min as Seo-hwa
 The woman Shin Woo-yeo loved in the past and left a lasting impression. She was his first love who lost her life because of the fox bead Woo-yeo transferred into her.
 Kim Eung-soo as Shin Woo-yeo's transformation (ep. 1)
 Han Ji-eun as leader of publishing company (ep. 1, 5–6)
 Go Kyung-pyo as Sansin – a mountain spirit that watches over Shin Woo-yeo and Lee Dam (ep. 7, 10, 11, 13, 14)
 Jang Sung-kyu as Lee Dam's blind date and Do Jae-jin's senior. (ep. 6)
 He was arrogant and self-obsessed. He looked down on Dam during their first meet and as a result, fell down on the floor due to Shin Woo-yeo's magic.
 Oh Hyun-kyung as Kim Hyun-kyung (ep. 6)
 Lee Dam and Lee Dan's mother, and a fashion magazine editor.
 Kang Mi-na as Choi Jin-ah (ep. 8, 11)
 Do Jae-jin's ex-girlfriend.
 Son Seong-yoon as Seo Young-joo, a professor of ancient history at Seogwan University
 Lee Jun-hyuk as Professor Park Bo-gum
  The professor was famous for his rigor in the history department.
 Oh Jung-se as Do Jae-gang, Jae-jin's brother 
 Shim Hyung-tak as Gye Sun-woo's uncle, owner of a restaurant

Production
This is the first Korean TV series produced by iQIYI. It is a joint production between China and South Korea. Lee Hye-ri and Jang Ki-yong both starred in Schoolgirl Detectives previously. Lee and Park Kyung-hye also previously worked together in a workplace themed drama Miss Lee. Kang Han-na and Kim Do-wan previously starred together in the 2020 drama Start-Up.

Original soundtrack

Part 1

Part 2

Part 3

Part 4

Part 5

Part 6

Part 7

Part 8

Part 9

Viewership

References

External links
  
 My Roommate Is a Gumiho at Naver 
 My Roommate Is a Gumiho at Daum 
 
 
 My Roommate Is a Gumiho at iQiyi

TVN (South Korean TV channel) television dramas
Korean-language television shows
2021 South Korean television series debuts
2021 South Korean television series endings
Television series by Studio Dragon
South Korean romantic comedy television series
South Korean fantasy television series
Television series by JTBC Studios
Television series by Drama House
Television series by Zium Content
IQIYI original programming